Air America is a 1990 American action comedy film directed by Roger Spottiswoode and starring Mel Gibson and Robert Downey Jr. as Air America pilots flying missions in Laos during the Vietnam War. When the protagonists discover their aircraft is being used by government agents to smuggle heroin, they must avoid being framed as the drug-smugglers.

The plot of the film is adapted from Christopher Robbins' 1979 non-fiction book, chronicling the CIA-financed airline to transport weapons and supplies in Cambodia, Laos and South Vietnam during the Vietnam War.

The publicity for the film, advertised as a lighthearted buddy movie, implied a tone that differs greatly from the actual film, which includes such serious themes as an anti-war message, focus on the opium trade, and a negative portrayal of Royal Laotian General Vang Pao (played by actor Burt Kwouk as "General Lu Soong").

Plot

In late 1969, Billy Covington works as a helicopter traffic pilot for a Los Angeles radio station. When he breaks several safety regulations by flying too low, the U.S. Federal Aviation Administration suspends his pilot's license. However, his piloting skills, bravery and disregard for the law are noticed by a mysterious government agent, who tells Billy that he can get his license back if he accepts a job in Laos, working for a "strictly civilian" company called Air America. It is readily apparent that Air America is a front for CIA operations in Laos.

Unemployed and unable to find work, Billy takes the job. In Laos, he is introduced to Air America's unorthodox pilots and aircraft, being taken under the wing of Gene Ryack, a cynical and eccentric pilot and an arms dealer who uses official flights to buy black market weapons for his private cache. His dream, which he refers to as his "retirement plan," is to make a sale big enough so that he can afford to quit his job at Air America.

The next day, Senator Davenport arrives in Laos on a "fact-finding mission," to investigate rumors about Air America transporting drugs on behalf of Laotian forces. Major Lemond and Rob Diehl, CIA leaders of Air America, show the Senator around refugee camps, shrines, temples, and major cities in a careful deception to hide from him that Air America is indeed transporting drugs.

While airdropping livestock into rural villages in their C-123 cargo aircraft, Billy and Jack Neely are shot down. The Pilatus PC-6 of General Soong arrives at the crash site and his soldiers load bags of opium on board, but leave Billy and Jack behind with Communist forces moving in. Gene and another pilot arrive and rescue them; Billy boards Gene's helicopter while the rest of the crew escape in another aircraft.

Billy and Gene's helicopter is shot down on the way back, and they are captured by a rural tribe. Gene notices that the tribe is using obsolete and unreliable guns and strikes a deal to supply them with better weapons. Allowed to go free, Billy and Gene retreat to Gene's house, where Billy is surprised to discover that Gene has a wife and children. Already disillusioned with U.S. actions in Laos, Gene convinces Billy to quit his job with Air America, but Billy wants to get even with General Soong for betraying him when he crashed.

Meanwhile, Senator Davenport is losing patience with Lemond and Diehl, and demands to know who is smuggling heroin. Soon after their return to base, the pilots learn that during his search for Billy and Gene, Jack was killed and Lemond and Diehl claim that he was the ring leader behind the drug trafficking. Enraged, Billy purchases grenades on the black market and uses them to blow up the heroin factory, but guards see him running away. Davenport is still unsatisfied, and demands more concrete evidence.

The next day, Gene finds a buyer for his arsenal, allowing him to leave gunrunning, quit Air America, and take his family out of the country. Meanwhile, Billy accepts one more flight before he actually quits. With co-pilot Babo, he is assigned to transport flour to a refugee camp but they are instructed to divert to a nearby airstrip for "routine inspection." Billy immediately suspects a setup, and a search reveals several kilos of heroin hidden in the flour-sacks. With his fuel gauge tampered with, Babo and Billy decide to crash-land on the same airstrip where Billy crashed a few days earlier, and use the wreckage of the previous crash to hide the smaller aircraft.

Gene, on his way to make his final, largest weapons delivery, flies in to rescue Babo and Billy after wondering why Billy can't seem to keep anything in the air. Billy convinces him to respond to a distress call from a refugee camp caught in the crossfire between General Soong's men and local rebels. Gene tries to rescue the United States Agency for International Development official in charge of the camp; however, she refuses to leave without the refugees. After some initial resistance, Gene dumps the weapons to make room for the refugees, blowing up the weapons cache to cover their escape.

In the air, Gene and Billy come up with a scheme to sell the aircraft to give Gene his money back. Senator Davenport recognizes the setup for what it was, and the Senator threatens to reveal Lemond and Diehl's operation to Washington.

Cast

 Mel Gibson as Gene Ryack
 Robert Downey Jr. as Billy Covington
 Nancy Travis as Corinne Landreaux
 Ken Jenkins as Major Donald Lemond (Based on Richard Secord)
 David Marshall Grant as Robert Diehl (Based on Jerry Daniels)
 Lane Smith as Senator Davenport (Based on Senator Stuart Symington)
 Art LaFleur as Jack Neely
 Ned Eisenberg as Nick Pirelli
 Marshall Bell as O.V.
 David Bowe as Saunders
 Burt Kwouk as General Lu Soong (Based on General Vang Pao)
 Tim Thomerson as Babo
 Harvey Jason as Nino

Production

Development
Director Richard Rush tried to develop the film in 1985, as the first comedy about Vietnam. Carolco Pictures bought the project as Rush wrote a script and found locations. Sean Connery was attached to play the older pilot, Gene Ryack, and the younger flier Billy Covington was at different times to be played by Bill Murray, James Belushi and Kevin Costner. The project was sold to producer Daniel Melnick after Connery and Costner became too expensive. Melnick hired screenwriter John Eskow to write a new script; and first hired director Bob Rafelson to work with Rush, but eventually hiring director Roger Spottiswoode. Mel Gibson was cast for a reported $7 million, for the role of Ryack, and Robert Downey Jr. took on the role of Covington. Nancy Travis was cast as Corinne Landroaux, replacing Ally Sheedy, and Michael Dudikoff was cast as General Lee.

Filming
The budget of Air America increased to $35 million as the production involved a 500-member crew shooting in 49 different locations between Thailand, London, and Los Angeles; operating between eight and fifteen cameras at a time. Principal photography began on October 3, 1989, and continued until February 10, 1990. The production was plagued by two earthquakes and a typhoon. The producers rented 26 aircraft from the Thai military, although some of the stunt flyers refused to perform some of the stunts, with 60-year-old veterans being drafted for the more demanding turns. PepsiCo wanted the filmmakers to use a fictional soda rather than show opium being refined at their abandoned factory. Therefore, the producers added a line about wondering if Pepsi knew what was going on. After previewing the film, six months after production, Gibson and other principals were called back to film a new ending.

Soundtrack

Reception

On review aggregator website Rotten Tomatoes, the film holds an approval rating of 13% based on 16 reviews, with an average rating of 3.4/10. Metacritic reports a weighted average score of 33 out of 100, based on 13 critics, indicating "generally unfavorable reviews". Audiences polled by CinemaScore gave the film an average grade of "B" on an A+ to F scale.

Upon its release, Air America was embroiled in controversy over its treatment of the "secret CIA airline service." After the Persian Gulf War began on January 15, 1991, the film was withdrawn from distribution in over 100 cinemas throughout Germany. Air America received mostly negative reviews from critics. The film review in The New York Times by Caryn James, saw the film as a flawed "star vehicle". "This muddled film about a secret C.I.A. project in Laos in 1969 fails on every possible level: as action film, as buddy film, as scenic travelogue and even, sad to say, as a way to flaunt Mel Gibson's appeal." Film historian Alun Evans in Brassey's Guide to War Films, in his commentary, was brief but pointed in characterizing Air America as a "... tawdry, unfunny war comedy."

Some criticism was levelled at the inaccuracies prevalent in the production. The review of Air America in the St. Paul Pioneer Press noted: "... the comedy adventure doesn't feature any real heroes of that war, men like the Hmong pilot Lee Lue." Christopher Robbins said the movie distorted his book's presentation of the Air America story, and historian William Leary noted "The exploits of CAT/Air America form a unique chapter in the history of air transport, one that deserves better than a misleading, mediocre movie."

British film critic Andy Webb opined that Air America worked as an aviation film. "... on a small positive some of the flying stunts, and there are plenty of them, are pretty spectacular. In a movie which almost floats these moments of aeronautic acrobats (they) give an injection of adrenalin although by no means enough to save it."

Alexander Cockburn wrote in the Los Angeles Times that Air America received abuse for "dar[ing] to say the unsayable, and commits the added offense of joking about it ... It injects into mass culture truth on a matter that official America has been lying about for three decades, namely the confluence between U.S. covert operations and criminality, whether in Laos, Afghanistan or Central America".

Box office
Air America debuted at number three behind Flatliners and Young Guns II. The film ended up grossing $31,053,601 in the US and $3,243,404 in other countries for a worldwide total of $36,297,005.

References

Bibliography

 Carrrick, Peter. Mel Gibson. London: Robert Hale, 1998. .
 Clarkson, Wensley. Mel Gibson: Man on a Mission. London: John Blake, 2004. .
 Curry, Robert. Whispering Death, "Tuag Nco Ntsoov": Our Journey with the Hmong in the Secret War for Laos. Bloomington, Indiana: IUniverse Inc., 2004. .
 Evans, Alun. Brassey's Guide to War Films. Dulles, Virginia: Potomac Books, 2000. .
 Hamilton-Merritt, Jane. Tragic Mountains: The Hmong, the Americans, and the Secret Wars for Laos, 1942-1992 . Bloomington, Indiana: Indiana University Press, 1999. .
 Robbins, Christopher. Air America. Cassell Military 2012. .

External links

 
 
 
 
 Air America Association web site

1990 films
1990 action comedy films
1990s adventure comedy films
1990s buddy comedy films
American action comedy films
American adventure comedy films
American aviation films
American buddy comedy films
Carolco Pictures films
1990s English-language films
Films based on military novels
Films directed by Roger Spottiswoode
Films set in 1969
Films set in Laos
Films shot in Thailand
Films shot at Pinewood Studios
StudioCanal films
Thai-language films
TriStar Pictures films
Vietnamese-language films
Vietnam War aviation films
War adventure films
Films based on non-fiction books
1990s American films